The 2014 Vietnamese Cup is the 22nd edition of the Vietnamese Cup. It began on 8 March 2014 and finished on 17 August 2014.

First round

Second round

Ninh Bình wrote to the Vietnam Football Federation (VFF) and to the Vietnam Professional Football Joint Stock Company to be allowed to stop their participation in the league/cup and also the AFC Cup due to 13 players being involved in match fixing. They had played 8 league matches and were third from bottom at the time. Following their withdrawal from the league, all their results were declared null and void. QNK Quảng Nam awarded as 3–0 after Ninh Bình withdraw.

Quarter-finals

Semi-finals

Final

References

External links
  Official website
  Results

Vietnamese National Cup
Cup